Verticordia aereiflora is a flowering plant in the myrtle family, Myrtaceae and is endemic to the south-west of Western Australia. It is a thin but bushy shrub with small leaves and greenish-yellow flowers with red spots and red fringes on the sepals.

Description
Flowering time is from November to January.

Taxonomy and naming
The species was first formally described by Elizabeth George and Alex George in 1994 and the description was published in Nuytsia from specimens collected near Yuna. The specific epithet (aereiflora) "is from the Latin aereus - bronze and flos - a flower, in reference to the colour of the flowers.

The authors of the same paper placed this species in subgenus Eperephes, section Pennuligera along with V. comosa, V. lepidophylla, V. chrysostachys, V. dichroma, V. x eurardyensis, V. muelleriana, V. argentea, V. albida, V. fragrans, V. venusta, V. forrestii, V. serotina, V. oculata, V. etheliana and V. grandis.

Distribution and habitat
This verticordia grows in deep yellow sand near claypans in open shrubland in an area of about  near Yuna in the Geraldton Sandplains biogeographic region.

Conservation
V. aereiflora is classified as "Priority Two" by the Western Australian Government Department of Parks and Wildlife meaning that it is poorly known and from only one or a few locations. The population is estimated to consist of 200 individual plants on farming property in an area being managed for the plants' protection.

Use in horticulture
This small shrub would be suitable as a container plant with its small leaves, bushy habit and prolific and attractive flowers. Experiments in propagating the species are being undertaken and it has been grown from cuttings, from seed and by grafting onto Chamelaucium uncinatum. Unfortunately, attempts to grow plants in the ground have often led to sudden and unexplained deaths.

References

aereiflora
Rosids of Western Australia
Eudicots of Western Australia
Plants described in 1994